John Miller (1839 in Kurhessen, Germany – March 8, 1882) won a Medal of Honor for his service during the American Civil War. He was born Henry Fey.

Biography
He was born on 1839 in Kurhessen, Germany.

Miller enlisted in the Army from Rochester, New York in December 1863. He earned the Medal of Honor for his actions on March 2, 1865 in Waynesboro, Virginia during the Battle of Waynesboro. His citation reads, "capture of flag." He mustered out with his regiment in June 1865. 

Following his death in 1882, he was initially interred at Glenwood Cemetery in Philadelphia, Pennsylvania, however he was reinterred to Northwood Cemetery in Philadelphia.

References

External links

1839 births
1882 deaths
Hessian emigrants to the United States
People of New York (state) in the American Civil War
Union Army soldiers
United States Army Medal of Honor recipients
German-born Medal of Honor recipients
American Civil War recipients of the Medal of Honor
Burials at Glenwood Cemetery/Glenwood Memorial Gardens
Burials at Northwood Cemetery, Philadelphia